Deh Now (also Romanized as Deh-e Now and Deh Nau; also known as Deh-e Nāb, Dehnow Daragah, and Dehnow-e Darāgāh) is a village in Dar Agah Rural District, in the Central District of Hajjiabad County, Hormozgan Province, Iran. At the 2006 census, its population was 262, in 59 families.

References 

Populated places in Hajjiabad County